Howard Wallace Pollock (April 11, 1920 – January 9, 2011) was an American politician and Republican Representative from Alaska.

Biography
Pollock was born in Chicago to Olga (née Deblanc) and Oscar Tobias Pollock, and grew up in New Orleans. He went to high school in Perkinston, Mississippi and graduated from Perkinston Junior College. He enlisted as a seaman in the United States Navy in 1941 and retired with rank of lieutenant commander in 1946. During his service in World War II, he lost his right forearm to a grenade accident while training in the South Pacific in 1944.

He studied law at Santa Clara University School of Law and at the University of Houston, and then did some post-graduate studies at MIT, from which he earned a M.S. in industrial management. He was a practicing attorney.

Pollock served in the Alaska Territorial Legislature from 1953–1955. He later served in the Alaska Senate from 1961–1963 and 1965–1966; and was elected as a Republican to the Ninetieth and Ninety-first Congresses (January 3, 1967 – January 3, 1971). He was not a candidate for reelection in 1970 to the Ninety-second Congress, but rather was an unsuccessful candidate for Republican  nomination for Governor of Alaska. Pollock was also a past president of the National Rifle Association.

From 1998 until his death in January 2011, Pollock was a resident of Arlington, Virginia.

Electoral history

References

External links

 
 Howard Pollock at 100 Years of Alaska's Legislature

1920 births
2011 deaths
20th-century American politicians
Alaska lawyers
Alaska state senators
American amputees
United States Navy personnel of World War II
American politicians with disabilities
Businesspeople from Anchorage, Alaska
Lawyers from Anchorage, Alaska
MIT Sloan School of Management alumni
Members of the Alaska Territorial Legislature
Republican Party members of the United States House of Representatives from Alaska
Military personnel from Illinois
National Oceanic and Atmospheric Administration personnel
Politicians from Anchorage, Alaska
People from Arlington County, Virginia
People from Stone County, Mississippi
Politicians from Chicago
Politicians from New Orleans
Presidents of the National Rifle Association
Santa Clara University alumni
United States Navy officers
University of Houston Law Center alumni
Virginia Republicans
20th-century American businesspeople
20th-century American lawyers
Mississippi Gulf Coast Community College alumni